The Tamborine Mountain road network is a group of roads that provide access to the mountain community from various lowland localities. The network ensures continuity of access in times of flooding or other natural disasters, and during planned maintenance activities. The locality of Tamborine Mountain includes a plateau that hosts a substantial residential community plus many tourism accommodation and activity venues.

Located to the south-west of Brisbane and north-west of the Gold Coast, in Queensland, Australia, Tamborine Mountain is also a popular day-trip destination.

Roads in the network
The following roads are considered to be part of the network:

Beaudesert–Beenleigh Road

Beaudesert–Beenleigh Road passes through Tamborine village, bringing traffic from the Mount Lindesay Highway to the south-west and from the Pacific Motorway to the north-east. Some of the traffic on this road then travels on Tamborine Mountain Road to reach Tamborine Mountain.

Beaudesert–Nerang Road

Tamborine Mountain Road

Tamborine Mountain Road runs from Tamborine village in the north-west to Tamborine Mountain and continues south to Canungra. It carries most of the traffic from Brisbane to Tamborine Mountain.

Tamborine–Nerang Road

Tamborine–Nerang Road is a state-controlled district road (number 2050) rated as a local road of regional significance (LRRS). It is known in parts by each of the following local names:

Petition for improvements
In October 2021 a petition requesting improvements to Tamborine Mountain roads was presented to the Queensland Parliament. Particular mention was made of the poor condition of Golf Course Road, Guanaba Road and Henri Robert Drive, all components of this road. Also mentioned was Main Western Road, the component of Tamborine Mountain Road used to access this road.

Tamborine–Oxenford Road

Tamborine–Oxenford Road is a state-controlled district road (number 206) rated as a local road of regional significance (LRRS). It is known in parts by each of the following local names:

Upgrade project
A project to upgrade the Howard Creek Causeway, at a cost of $10 million, entered the construction phase in October 2021.

Waterford–Tamborine Road

Waterford–Tamborine Road is a state-controlled district road (number 207) rated as a local road of regional significance (LRRS). Much of the traffic from this road then travels on Tamborine Mountain Road to reach Tamborine Mountain. The road is known for a short distance in Waterford as Nerang Street.

Upgrade projects
Five upgrade projects are in planning, progress or recently completed for this road. They are:

See also

 List of road routes in Queensland
 List of numbered roads in Queensland

Notes

References

Roads in Queensland
Tamborine Mountain